The 1920 PGA Championship was the third PGA Championship, which is now considered one of golf's major championships. It was held August 17–21 at the Flossmoor Country Club outside Flossmoor, Illinois, a suburb south of Chicago. The field of 32 qualified through sectional tournaments. They competed in 36-hole match play rounds in a single-elimination tournament.

Harry Hampton made a surprising run by winning three consecutive matches before finally succumbing to Jock Hutchison in a semi-final match 4 and 3. James Douglas Edgar won the other semi-final over George McLean by a resounding 8 and 7 margin. Hutchison defeated Edgar, 1 up, in the final.

Two-time defending champion Jim Barnes lost in the second round to Clarence Hackney, 5 and 4.

Bracket 1

Bracket 2

Bracket 3

Bracket 4

Final four

References

External links
PGA Media Guide 2012
Results at golfobserver.com
PGA.com – 1920 PGA Championship

PGA Championship
Golf in Illinois
PGA Championship
PGA Championship
PGA Championship
PGA Championship